Odisha State Open University (OSOU) is a distance learning state university  located in Sambalpur, Odisha, India. The university is established by an Act of the Odisha State Legislature in 2015. The university has jurisdiction over the entire State of Odisha.

Schools
 School of Social Science & Humanities(English, Hindi, Odia, Sanskrit, History, Political Science, Sociology, Economics,  Public Administration,  Rural Development, Journalism and Mass Communication, Public Policy)
 School of Science & Technology
 School of Education (Continuing and Extension)
 School of Teachers Training
 School of Business and Management Studies(Commerce, Management) 
 School of Health Care Sciences(Geriatric Care)
 School of Computer and Information Sciences(Computer Science)
 School of Agriculture

Study Centres
OSOU has established 67 Study Centres at Sambalpur, Bhubaneswar, Berhampur, Rourkela, Jeypore, Koraput, Balasore, Bhadrak, Jajpur, Cuttack, Jagatsinghpur, Paralakhemundi, Malkangiri, Bolangir, Bargarh, Bhawanipatna, Athagarh, Angul, Dhenkanal, Pallahara, Puri, Kendrapara, Khurda, Keonjhar, Nabrangpur, Jharsuguda, Deogarh, Baripada, Nayagarh, Rayagada and Sonepur. Learners are attached to these centres for academic support through trained counsellors and tutors.

References

Open universities in India
Department of Higher Education, Odisha
State agencies of Odisha
Universities in Odisha
Universities and colleges in Sambalpur
2015 establishments in Odisha
Educational institutions established in 2015